One Wall Centre, also known as the Sheraton Vancouver Wall Centre North Tower, is a 48-storey,  skyscraper hotel with residential condominiums in the Wall Centre development at 1088 Burrard Street in Downtown Vancouver, British Columbia, Canada. The tower was designed by Perkins+Will Canada, and completed in 2001, and went on to win the Emporis Skyscraper Award for the Best New Skyscraper the same year. As of March 2018 it is the fourth-tallest building in the city.

The first 27 floors of the building are the 4 Diamond Sheraton Hotel. Floors 28, 29, and 30 are the Club Intrawest Resort floors; which are operated independent of Sheraton. Floors 31 to 48 are residential condominiums. The One Wall Centre tower is part of the Wall Centre complex owned by Wall Financial Corporation and was largely the vision of Peter Wall.

Construction

To counteract possible harmonic swaying during high winds, One Wall has a tuned water damping system at the top level of the building which consists of two specially designed  water tanks. These tanks are designed so that the harmonic frequency of the sloshing of the water in the tanks counteracts the harmonic frequency of the swaying of the building.

According to the June 2004 edition of Elevator World, Richmond Elevator Maintenance Ltd. won a contract for the lowest bid to supply the building's elevators, one of the local elevator firm's first examples of traction elevators. The installation features 10 elevators, 8 of which are high speed geared machines. There are 6 escalators installed by Fujitec.

During construction, as the building's glass was completed on the lower floors, construction was stopped as the City of Vancouver disagreed with the dark colour of glass that being applied. The building was completed with the upper floors a more translucent shade of glass, resulting in a two-toned appearance. The translucent windows were ultimately defective and replaced with darker windows, resulting in a uniform appearance of the building, in 2013.

Cultural references 
 This building was featured in the movie X-Men: The Last Stand as one of the buildings they used to give the cure to the mutants.
 The opening sequence of The Core, where a man collapses at a business meeting and the camera pans out to the street to show a number of simultaneous accidents, was filmed here.
 The plaza directly in front of this building was used in exterior shots for the 1996 Fox TV series Profit to represent the immediate area outside the corporate offices of fictional Gracen & Gracen Inc (G&G). While the One Wall Centre building did not exist in 1996 when the series was filmed, the two towers immediately adjacent to this building were featured prominently in the series as the corporate headquarters for G&G.
 The courtyard of the Wall Centre appears in Caprica's season 1 episode, "Retribution".

Gallery

See also
 List of tallest buildings in Vancouver

References

External links

 One Wall Centre condominiums official website
 One Wall Centre project page at the Glotman•Simpson Group
 Emporis 2001 Award

Skyscrapers in Vancouver
Residential buildings completed in 2001
Residential skyscrapers in Canada
Skyscraper hotels in Canada
Modernist architecture in Canada
Condo hotels in Canada
2001 establishments in British Columbia